Allan Dzhoakimovich Dugblei (born 4 January 1985) is a retired Russian professional football player.

Club career
He made his Russian Football National League debut for FC Chernomorets Novorossiysk on 8 April 2009 in a game against FC Vityaz Podolsk.

Personal life
His mother is Russian and father is from Ghana. As a child, he lived in Africa for several years.

References

External links
 

1985 births
Living people
Russian footballers
FC Asmaral Moscow players
FC Chernomorets Novorossiysk players
Russian people of Ghanaian descent
Footballers from Moscow
Association football midfielders
FC Shinnik Yaroslavl players
FC Izhevsk players